Rosaline Ufuoma Meurer (born 15 February 1992), is a Gambian-born Nigerian actress and producer. She is most known for her 2014 role as Kaylah in the TV series Oasis and 2018 role as Kemi Alesinloye in Ayo Makun's Merry Men: The Real Yoruba Demons.

Early life and education
Meurer grew up in The Gambia where she had her early education. She has a diploma in business management and studied photography.

Career
While growing up, Meurer loved aircraft and flying and dreamt of becoming an air hostess or a pilot. She started her career as a model in The Gambia, before moving to Nigeria in 2009. She was discovered in The Gambia in 2009 by Nigerian actor and politician, Desmond Elliot who advised her to try acting in Nigeria. She moved to Lagos, Nigeria, and started her movie career, starring in a minor role in the 2009 Emem Isong's film Spellbound and the 2011 film In the Cupboard.

In 2012, she also starred in a minor role in Weekend Getaway. After starring in the 2012 movie, she stopped acting for a while and went back to school in The Gambia, before coming back to Nigeria to continue her acting career. When she returned in 2014, she joined the cast of the TV series Oasis, starring in a lead role as Kaylah. The following year, she played Nneka in Damaged Petl, and starred in Red Card and Open Marriage.

In 2017, she starred in the main role in Our Dirty Little Secret. In the same year, she played Monica in the TV series Philip and Polycarp and starred in The Incredible Father, Pebbles of Love, and Our Dirty Little Secret. She later went on to produce her first movie The Therapist's Therapy. In 2018, she played the lead role as Valerie in Eniola Badmus's film Karma and starred as Kemi Alesinloye in Ayo Makun's Merry Men: The Real Yoruba Demons.

Philanthropy
On 25 May 2017, Meurer rehabilitated and commissioned Udu Main Market Water Project in Udu, Delta State. As an ambassador of the Big Church Foundation on Women and Child, she donated money to pregnant women at 3-H Clinic and Maternity in Warri, Delta State.

Other ventures
Meurer is an ambassador of Multisheen Ebony. In 2015, she became an ambassador of the Big Church Foundation on Women and Children. She appeared on the cover of the April 2017 House Of Maliq Magazine issue. In April 2019, she signed an endorsement deal with DoctorCare247. Four months later, she signed an endorsement deal with Glo.

Personal life
Meurer was born in The Gambia to a Dutch father and Nigerian mother from Delta State. She is the first child in a family of three. She is now married to Olakunle Churchill and has a child with him.

Filmography

Film

Television

Awards and nominations

References

External links 
 
 

1992 births
Living people
People from Delta State
Gambian film actresses
Nigerian film actresses
Gambian people of Nigerian descent
Gambian people of Dutch descent
Nigerian people of Dutch descent
21st-century Nigerian actresses
Igbo actresses
Nigerian film award winners